Delisha Boyd is an American politician and real estate broker serving as a member of the Louisiana House of Representatives from the 102nd district. She assumed office on November 29, 2021.

Early life and education 
Boyd was raised in Uptown New Orleans and graduated from Xavier University Preparatory School. She earned a Bachelor of Business Administration from Southern University at New Orleans, a Master of Fine Arts from the University of New Orleans, and a Master of Business Administration from the University of Phoenix.

Career 
From 1993 to 2011, Boyd operated a talent and casting agency. From 2011 to 2014, she worked as an associate real estate broker and investor. In 2014, she established Delisha Boyd, LLC, a full-serviced real estate brokerage. She's licensed in Georgia, Louisiana and Mississippi. Since 2015, Boyd has also worked as a notary. She was elected to the Louisiana House of Representatives in a November 2021 special election.

References 

Living people
Democratic Party members of the Louisiana House of Representatives
Women state legislators in Louisiana
African-American state legislators in Louisiana
Politicians from New Orleans
Southern University at New Orleans alumni
University of New Orleans alumni
University of Phoenix alumni
Year of birth missing (living people)